Archbishop Edward A. McCarthy High School (abbreviated AMHS) was opened in 1998 in Southwest Ranches, Florida, United States. Sponsored by the Roman Catholic Archdiocese of Miami, it is accredited through the Southern Association of Colleges and Schools. Named after the second Archbishop of Miami, Edward A. McCarthy, the school's mascot is the Maverick. The  founding principal of the school was Dr. Richard Perhla. Students wear a uniform consisting of a solid white or light blue shirt, AMHS khaki slacks, a black leather belt, black shoes, and a student ID with AMHS lanyard. As of the 2019–2020 school year, there are 1,700 students enrolled in grades nine through twelve. Since 2005 AMHS has been named one of the Top 50 Catholic Schools in the nation by the Catholic High School Honor Roll and is a part of the Catholic Education Honor Roll for 2018–2023. Archbishop McCarthy is an Apple Distinguished School. AMHS has received Innovations in Catholic Education from Today's Catholic Teacher.

Campus 
Archbishop McCarthy High School is a Catholic college preparatory institution in the South Florida area. The campus consists of a main two-story building, a football field with a surrounding track, one baseball diamond, one softball diamond, a Student Center with its own "Maverick Grill" and a Performing Arts Center. The school has an air conditioned gymnasium, indoor weight room, five "learning modules", an outdoor courtyard, a chapel, and a  parking area.

The iPad 2 Program

With the start of the 2011–2012 school year, Archbishop McCarthy High School implemented a student one-to-one iPad school, making it the first in South Florida. This system allows students as well teachers to enhance the classroom environment and make learning state-of-the-art. Most iPads have textbooks and allow the students many opportunities to access their textbooks, take notes, and complete their assignments. This program is one of the most renowned accomplishments by AMHS as a college preparatory and top Catholic high school.

Academics 
The school is a college preparatory institution. Archbishop McCarthy has been awarded National Catholic high school honor roll every year since 2005.  The school has a dual enrollment program through St. Thomas University in addition to an Advanced Placement Program. AMHS draws students from Broward, Dade and Palm Beach counties.

In the 2016–2017 school year, Archbishop McCarthy offers the following Advanced Placement Courses:

AP Studio Art: Drawing

AP Biology

AP Calculus I AB

AP Calculus II BC

AP Chemistry

AP Computer Science

AP English Language and Composition

AP English Literature and Composition

AP Environmental Science

AP French Language

AP Human Geography

AP Macroeconomics

AP Physics 1

AP Physics 2

AP Spanish Language

AP Spanish Literature

AP Statistics

AP United States Government and Politics

AP United States History

AP World History

In 2017, the school had 7 National Merit finalists. The school has a nearly perfect college acceptance rate, including students currently attending schools such as Yale University, Columbia University, and Duke University.

Athletics 
, sponsored sports activities at the school included:

Baseball
Basketball (Men's)
Basketball (Women's)
Bowling (Men's)
Bowling (Women's)
Cross Country
Cheerleading (Women's)
Dance
Equestrian
Flag Football (Women's)
Football
Golf
Ice Hockey
Lacrosse (Men's and Women's(2017))
Marching Band
Rugby
Soccer (Men's)
Soccer (Women's)
Softball
Swimming
Tennis (Men's)
Tennis (Women's)
Track
Volleyball
Wrestling
Weightlifting (Women's)

Sister school 
Archbishop Edward McCarthy High School is the sister school of Archbishop Coleman F. Carroll High School. Both schools have identical original building blueprints and similar school colors. Both schools were established in 1998.

References

External links 
 Official School Website

Educational institutions established in 1998
Catholic secondary schools in Florida
Private high schools in Broward County, Florida
Schools accredited by the Southern Association of Colleges and Schools
1998 establishments in Florida